The 2008 AFF U-16 Youth Championship is the first edition of the tournament as an under-16 youth championship as it was previously played at under-17 level. It took place in Jakarta, Indonesia in July 2008.

Only five nations took part which includes associate AFF member Australia and guest nation Bahrain, competing in a round-robin format with the top two teams playing in the final.

Participating nations

Tournament 
All times are Western Indonesian Time (WIT) - UTC+7

Group stage

Third place play-off

Final

Winner

Goalscorers 

4 goals
 Kamal Ibrahim
 Kerem Bulut

2 goals
 Salman Ahmed Aldakheel
 Muhammad Muhaymin Salim
 D. Saarvindran
 Ahmad Fauzan Yahya

1 goal
 Joseph Costa
 Brendan Hamill
 Jared Lum
 Marc Warren
 Tedros Alemaw Yabio

1 goal
 Sayed Dhiya Saeed
 Ahmed Isa Ali
 Hasan Ahmed Ishaq
 Ali Muneer Redha
 Fahreza Agamal
 Garry Steven Robbat
 Mohammad Aminuddin Samki
 Mohamed Amer Saidin
 Sabri Sahar
 Iffi Afinaz Ismail

Own goal
 Abduh Lestaluhu (for Australia)

External links 
AFF U16 Youth Championship 2008 at ASEAN Football Federation official website

2008 in AFF football
2008–09 in Indonesian football
2008
AFF
2008
2008 in youth association football